Cylas is a genus of sweet potato weevils in the beetle family Brentidae. There are more than 20 described species in Cylas.

Species
These 24 species belong to the genus Cylas:

 Cylas aeneus Hustache, 1922
 Cylas brunneus (Olivier, 1790)
 Cylas coimbatorensis (Subramanian, 1958)
 Cylas compressus Hartmann, 1899
 Cylas curtipennis Fairmaire, 1884
 Cylas cyanescens Boheman, 1833
 Cylas femoralis Faust, 1898
 Cylas formicarius (Fabricius, 1798) (sweet potato weevil)
 Cylas freyi Voss, 1966
 Cylas glabripennis Hartmann, 1897
 Cylas hovanus Hustache, 1933
 Cylas impunctatus Faust, 1891
 Cylas laevicollis Boheman, 1833
 Cylas laevigatus Fåhraeus, 1871
 Cylas longicollis Guérin-Méneville, 1833
 Cylas nigrocoerulans Fairmaire, 1902
 Cylas nitens Hustache, 1929
 Cylas pumilus Marshall, 1953
 Cylas puncticollis Boheman, 1833
 Cylas robustus Faust, 1895
 Cylas rufipes Faust, 1893
 Cylas semipunctatus Fåhraeus, 1871
 Cylas submetallicus Desbrochers des Loges, 1890
 Cylas vandenplasi Burgeon, 1936

References

Further reading

External links

 

Brentidae
Articles created by Qbugbot